The Rural Municipality of Humboldt No. 370 is a rural municipality (RM) in the Canadian province of Saskatchewan within Census Division No. 15 and  Division No. 5. Located in the central portion of the province, it is along Highway 5 and Highway 20 north of Regina and east of Saskatoon.

History 
The RM of Humboldt No. 370 incorporated as a rural municipality on January 1, 1913.

Heritage properties
The RM has two designated heritage properties:
The Humboldt Telegraph Station Site (constructed in 1876) built as part of the Dominion Telegraph Line, the station is on the original site for Humboldt, connecting Eastern Canada with  Selkirk with Fort Livingstone, Clark's Crossing, Battleford, Edmonton and British Columbia.  The station is located along the Carlton Trail.  The site was originally composed of two cabins, the first housing the telegraph and serving as a home for George Weldon and family while the second Ducharme House serving a residence for his assistant Joe Ducharme. 
Marysburg Assumption Church located in the former hamlet of Marysburg is a Roman Catholic church constructed of brick in 1921.  The church seats up to 400 and is of a Romanesque Revival style.

Geography

Communities and localities 
The following urban municipalities are surrounded by the RM.

Cities
Humboldt

The following unincorporated communities are within the RM.

Localities
Carmel
Fulda
Humboldt Beach, dissolved as a village February 1, 1947
Marysburg
Mount Carmel

Demographics 

Government 
The RM of Humboldt No. 370 is governed by an elected municipal council and an appointed administrator that meets on the second Tuesday of every month. The reeve of the RM is Larry Ries while its administrator is Corinne Richardson. The RM's office is located in Humboldt.

See also 
List of rural municipalities in Saskatchewan

References 

H

Humboldt, Saskatchewan
Division No. 15, Saskatchewan